Giovanni Antonio Maria Zanardini (12 June 1804, Venice – 24 April 1878) was an Italian physician and botanist who specialized in the field of phycology.

In 1831 he obtained his medical doctorate from the University of Padua, followed by a degree in surgery and obstetrics from the University of Pavia three years later. During his career, he worked as a physician in Padua and Venice. For a period of time, he served as secretary of the Istituto Veneto Scienze e Lettere.

The algae genus Zanardinia (in class Phaeophyceae),  is named after him, as are species with the epithet of zanardinii.

Published works 
 "Algae and related subjects - collected works", 1839.
 Notizie intorno alle cellulari marine delle lagune e de'litorali di Venezia, 1847.
 Prospetto della flora Veneta, 1847 - Prospectus of Venetian flora.
 "Plantarum in Mari Rubro hucusque collectarum enumerato (Juvante A. Figari)", 1858.
 Iconographia phycologica Adiratica : ossia, scelta di ficee nuove o piu rare del Mare Adriatico, 1860 - Iconography of Adriatic phycology.
 Iconographia phycologica mediterraneoadriatica ossia Scelta di ficee nuove o più rare dei mari mediterraneo ed adriatico, 1871 - Iconography of Mediterranean-Adriatic phycology. 
 "Phycearum Indicarum pugillus", 1872.

References 

1804 births
1878 deaths
Scientists from Venice
University of Padua alumni
University of Pavia alumni
19th-century Italian botanists
Phycologists
Physicians from Venice